Thomas Powell (28 October 1894 – 24 June 1964) was an Irish Gaelic footballer. His championship career at senior level with the Tipperary county team spanned six years from 1920 to 1926. Powell was a member of the Tipperary team that played on Bloody Sunday.

Career
Powell made his debut on the inter-county scene at the age of nineteen when he was selected for the Tipperary junior team. After an unsuccessful season with the junior team, he later joined the Tipperary senior team and made his debut during the 1918 championship. The highlight of Powell's inter-county career came in when he was part of the Tipperary team that won the 1920 All-Ireland final. Powell was the stand out player in the game, scoring 1-3 of Tipperary's 1-6 in their victory over Dublin. His late goal was critical.

He also won three Munster medals.

Honours
Tipperary
All-Ireland Senior Football Championship (1): 1920
Munster Senior Football Championship (3): 1918, 1920, 1922

References

1894 births
1964 deaths
Clonmel Commercials Gaelic footballers
Gaelic football backs
Ironmongers
Tipperary inter-county Gaelic footballers
Winners of one All-Ireland medal (Gaelic football)